The Hardin–Simmons Cowboys football team represents Hardin–Simmons University in the sport of college football.

Hardin–Simmons began competing in intercollegiate football in 1897. The program rose to prominence under Frank Kimbrough who compiled a 47–8–3 record as head coach from 1935 to 1940.  Kimbrough's teams played in the 1936 and 1937 Sun Bowls, and his undefeated and untied 1940 team was ranked No. 17 in the final AP Poll.

From 1941 to 1961, the team competed as a member of the Border Conference. During this time, the Cowboys won three conference championships: 1942 (shared with Texas Tech) and 1946 under head coach and College Football Hall of Fame inductee Warren B. Woodson, and 1958 under head coach  and College Football Hall of Fame inductee Sammy Baugh.  During the period of its membership in the Border Conference, the team appeared in seven bowl games, including a record three bowl games (Grape, Shrine, and Camellia Bowls) for the 1948 team.

From 1960 to 1963, the football program compiled a record of 3–35–1 and was outscored by a total of 999 to 313. In January 1964, the university trustees ordered the elimination of the university football program. The chairman of the board said the move was necessitated by "financial difficulties and losses" in the athletic program.

The school did not field a football team from 1964 to 1989. The football program returned in 1990, but the school now competes at the NCAA Division III level. Jimmie Keeling was the head coach for 21 years from 1990 to 2010, winning 11 American Southwest Conference championships and compiling a record of 172–53. Jesse Burleson has been the head coach since 2011.

Bowl game appearances
The Hardin–Simmons Cowboys have played in 8 NCAA-sanctioned bowl games with a record of 5–2–1.

 The Grape Bowl is listed in NCAA records, but was not an NCAA-sanctioned bowl game.

References

 
American football teams established in 1897
1897 establishments in Texas